Mir-Ali-Ashraf Abdollah Porihoseini (میرعلی اشرف عبدالله پوری حسینی in Persian, born 1961 in Tabriz, East Azerbaijan) is an Iranian economist, politician, vice president of Ministry of Economic Affairs and Finance and president of Iranian Privatization Organization in the cabinet of Hassan Rouhani and former member of Islamic Consultative Assembly from the electorate of Tabriz.

Controversy and Arrest
Porihoseini's actions in his capacity as the head of privatization organization has been controversial for few years especially the acquisition of a national meat factory (Ardabil Meat Industrial Complex) by a private entity that Porihoseini himself, was a stakeholder. On 14 August 2019 he was arrested on the charge of improper transactions and economic fraud.

Notes

References

People from Tabriz
1961 births
Living people
Iranian economists
Deputies of Tabriz, Osku and Azarshahr
Members of the 6th Islamic Consultative Assembly
Members of the 3rd Islamic Consultative Assembly
Islamic Iran Participation Front politicians